Finnish art started to form its individual characteristics in the 19th century, when romantic nationalism began to rise in the autonomous Grand Duchy of Finland.

Prehistoric art 

Marks of human activity in Finland has found in Susiluola, Kristinestad. Some excavation has been considered as a man-made over 100,000 years ago. After the Ice Age, area of Finland was resettled at around 9,000 years ago and first known sculpture Elk's Head of Huittinen (picture in stamp) has been dated about 5–7000 BCE.

Architecture

The most important products of medieval architecture in Finland are the medieval stone churches. More than a hundred of them were built during 15th and 16th centuries. Neoclassical architecture arrived in late 18th century, but important building projects started after 1808 when Finland was an autonomic part of Russia. Alexander II of Russia commissioned Carl Ludvig Engel to plan the new Senate and University for Helsinki.

Academic visual arts

The Finnish academic drawing tradition began at Royal Academy of Turku in 1707 when first instructions of drawing was given. In 1824 The School moves with the University to Helsinki and first Finland’s art exhibition was organised at the Drawing School in the autumn of 1845. Painting was rising in Golden era of Finnish art in 1880s, when romantic nationalism was the spirit of art. Akseli Gallen-Kallela started in naturalism but moved to national romanticism.

Modern art
In 1950s the Finnish artists looked for foreign influence: first in Paris, then in United States but also in Stockholm, where modern art exhibitions were organized in Moderna museet. Abstract art made its breakthrough first in concrete art. Early concretists included Birger Carlstedt and Sam Vanni. When Vanni's monumental painting Contrapunctus (1959) won competition for mural in Helsinki, abstract art was considered to be accepted and established in Finland.

Informalism spread quickly in 1950s and 1960s, when it was considered a new approach to landscape painting. It was also building on strong tradition of expressionism. It spread even outside of large cities.

In the late 20th century, the homoerotic art of Touko Valio Laaksonen, pseudonym Tom of Finland, found a worldwide audience, with his works entering the collection of the Museum of Modern Art in New York and appearing on Finnish postage stamps.

The Finnish contemporary art scene became much more visible than before with the establishment of Kiasma, the Museum of Contemporary Art in Helsinki in 1998.

See also 
 Culture of Finland
 Golden Age of Finnish Art
 Suomiart
 List of Finnish painters
 List of Finnish architects
 :Category:Finnish sculptors by century
 :Category:Finnish artists by century

References

External links

 The Golden Age of Finnish Art, Elina Ojala, University of Tampere.

 
Finnish culture